Shakti Kapoor (born 3 September 1952) is an Indian actor & comedian who appears in Bollywood films. Kapoor is mostly known for playing villainous and comical characters. In a career spanning over three decades, Kapoor has appeared in more than 700 films.

Filmography
Hindi films

Other Languages

 Web Series

References

External links
 

Male actor filmographies
Indian filmographies